Ralph Dewey (born August 8, 1944), also known as Dewdrop the Clown, is an American balloon twister who  is known as the "grandfather of all twisters".  He started twisting balloons in 1975, and in 1976 published his first book, Dewey's New Balloon Animals.  Since then he has published 30 books (16 on the subject of balloon twisting), numerous videos and DVDs, and dozens of magazine articles.

Early life
Dewey served in the US Air Force before joining Shell Chemicals as a non-degreed engineer.  He taught instrumentation at San Jacinto College in Houston, Texas, where he wrote several reference and training handbooks on instrumentation.

Balloon and clowning
As a leader in balloon twisting and gospel entertainment, Dewey helped found several organizations: Joey to the World, a gospel clown convention; DewJam Balloon Convention; and Kingdom Twisters.  Joey to the World is one of the largest and oldest Gospel Clowning Conventions in the world, first staged in 1994 and held in Houston, Texas. In 2003, he started presenting the Ralph Dewey Balloon Excellence Award, which has now become one of the highest honors in balloon-twisting.  Dewey is a staff writer for The Cross and the Clown magazine.  He has also written for Christian Conjurer, Balloon HQ, Clowning Around, and other similar publications.  Dewey is currently researching and writing a more comprehensive book on the history of balloon twisting.

David Grist was another pioneer in the balloon-twisting industry. Shortly before the annual Twist & Shout Convention in 2005, he died after suffering a heart attack.  In honor of Grist's contributions to the field, the organizers of Twist & Shout, the biggest balloon twisting convention, instituted the "David Grist Memorial Award", now considered to be the lifetime achievement award for balloon twisters.  Due to his contributions to the field of balloon twisting, Ralph Dewey received the first award in 2005.

Awards
Fellowship of Christian Magicians: 5 time recipient of the  "Best Balloon Lecture"
2004 Millennium Jam he was awarded the "Lifetime of Caring" award"
2005 DiamonJam  received a plaque celebrating "30 Years of Service to the Balloon Twisting industry"
2005 The David Grist Memorial World

References

External links
 
 Gospel Balloons

1944 births
Living people
American clowns
United States Air Force airmen
Balloon artists